is a former Japanese football player.

Playing career
Shimizu was born in Shizuoka Prefecture on April 30, 1975. After graduating from Hamana High School, he joined Japan Football League club Cerezo Osaka in 1994. Cerezo won the champions in 1994 and was promoted to J1 League from 1995. Although he could hardly play in the match until 1996, he played several matches in 1997. He played many matches as side back from 1998. His opportunity to play decreased in 2001 and Cerezo was also relegated to J2 League end of 2001 season. He retired end of 2001 season.

Club statistics

References

External links

1975 births
Living people
Association football people from Shizuoka Prefecture
Japanese footballers
J1 League players
Japan Football League (1992–1998) players
Cerezo Osaka players
Association football defenders